Tell Rasm El Hadeth is an archaeological site 18km north of Baalbek in the Beqaa Mohafazat (Governorate). It dates at least to the Neolithic.

References

Baalbek District
Neolithic settlements
Archaeological sites in Lebanon
Great Rift Valley